The Lycoming (now Honeywell) LTS101 is a turboshaft engine family ranging from 650 to 850 shaft horsepower, used in a number of popular helicopters, and, as the LTP101 turboprop, light aircraft. Both models carry the US military designation T702. The engine was originally designed at the Lycoming Turbine Engine Division in Stratford, Connecticut, but is now produced by Honeywell Aerospace.

Variants

LTP101-600
LTP101-700
LTS101-600A-2
LTS101-600A-3
LTS101-600A-3A
LTS101-650B-1
LTS101-650B-1A
LTS101-650C-2
LTS101-650C-3
LTS101-650C-3A
LTS101-700D-2
LTS101-750A-1
LTS101-750B-2
LTS101-750C-1
LTS101-850B-2
T702

Applications

 Aérospatiale HH-65A/B Dolphin
 Air Tractor AT-302
 Bell 222
 Cessna 421C Golden Eagle (turbine conversion)
 EcoJet concept car built under the direction of General Motors and Jay Leno
 Eurocopter AS350 AStar
 MBB/Kawasaki BK 117
 PAC Cresco
 Piaggio P166

Specifications (LTS101-650C-3/3A)

See also

References

External links

 Honeywell LTS101 page

1960s turboprop engines
LTS101
1960s turboshaft engines
LTS101